The 5th constituency of Doubs (French: Cinquième circonscription du Doubs) is one of five electoral districts in the department of the same name, each of which returns one deputy to the French National Assembly in elections using the two-round system, with a run-off if no candidate receives more than 50% of the vote in the first round.

Description
The constituency is made up of the nine former cantons of Amancey, Levier, Montbenoît, Morteau, Mouthe, Pierrefontaine-les-Varans, Pontarlier, Le Russey, and Vercel-Villedieu-le-Camp.

Geographically the largest of the department's constituencies, the 5th includes much of the Jura mountains and boasts long borders with Switzerland to the east and the Jura department to the south-west.

At the time of the 1999 census (which was the basis for the most recent redrawing of constituency boundaries, carried out in 2010) the 5th constituency had a total population of 95,007.

Uniquely in Doubs, the seat has been held continuously by Gaullist parties since 1988.

Historic representation

Election results

2022

2017

2012

Sources
Official results of French elections from 2002: "Résultats électoraux officiels en France" (in French).

5